Gary "Mani" Mounfield (born 16 November 1962) is an English rock bassist, best known for being a member of The Stone Roses and Primal Scream.

Career 
Mounfield attended Xaverian College in Rusholme, Manchester. He developed an interest in darts, a sport he went on to champion throughout his career. He left school aged sixteen in 1979 and joined the band the Stone Roses (part of the "Madchester" music scene) in 1987. Playing on both of the band's albums, Mounfield was in the Stone Roses until they disbanded in 1996, shortly after the birth of his son, Joseph, also a keen bassist. Mounfield used a Rickenbacker 4005 Jackson Pollock-influenced paint-splattered bass guitar in the period after the Stone Roses debut album. He joined Primal Scream after Stone Roses disbanded. He claimed that Primal Scream were one of three other bands that he would be willing to join – the Jesus and Mary Chain and Oasis being the others. In 2003, with Damon Minchella having left Ocean Colour Scene, he toured with the band supporting the Stereophonics, and he also did a DJ set for Ocean Colour Scene at their December 2008 Manchester gig. He was a full-time Primal Scream member until 2011 when he left to rejoin the Stone Roses.

Mounfield has often been viewed as the most amiable member of the Roses, both while the band were still together and following their break-up. Whilst in the past he had claimed that the band would reform only after "Manchester City won the European Cup", he was also viewed as the most likely member to be up for a Roses reunion. During the band's split, he occasionally joined Ian Brown on stage for renditions of songs by the Stone Roses ("Waterfall", "Made of Stone", "I Am the Resurrection"), as happened in 2008 at Summercase Festival (in Madrid and Barcelona), when both Primal Scream and Brown were playing on the same day. Mounfield and ex-Stone Roses drummer Reni were interviewed for the Manchester Music show on BBC GMR whilst attending a gig by the Coral. Mounfield toured with the Enemy on their UK tour, which involved a rare partaking in backing vocals.

Mounfield has a guest role in the movie 24 Hour Party People (2002), and was in a supergroup band called Freebass with bass players Andy Rourke (ex-the Smiths) and Peter Hook (Joy Division/New Order). Freebass disbanded before releasing its debut album, It's a Beautiful Life, in 2010.

In 2006, Mani fulfilled a lifelong ambition by playing live the album he described as the "most influential of his life" in full at the 100 Club, with two of the original artists when he played with Rat Scabies & Brian James of The Damned, at the 30th anniversary of their debut album, Damned Damned Damned.

Mounfield made a guest appearance on the STV fishing programme Trout 'n About along with former Primal Scream guitarist Throb and presenters Gregor Rankine and Paul Campion as they go trout fishing at Drummond Trout Farm & Fishery in Scotland.

Mounfield appeared at the "Manchester Versus Cancer" event on 30 March 2007, performing a DJ set and appearing with Ian Brown for the finale, the Stone Roses' "I Am the Resurrection". He also appeared as a celebrity guest at the 2009 World Darts Championship. He made a guest appearance at Paul Weller's performance at the Manchester MEN arena on 4 December 2010, playing tambourine.

On 18 October 2011, after touring the album Screamadelica with Primal Scream for most of that year, Mani revealed he had left Primal Scream to reform the Stone Roses.

Personal life 
Mounfield is a supporter of Manchester United and appeared on Sky One's programme Football Years. He also revealed on Play UK programme Nu Music that although he supports Manchester United in England, he is Mancunian Irish and was brought up to support Ireland. In 2019, Mani accepted the Made of Athy Award from his mother's hometown in Athy, Co. Kildare.

Awards

References

External links 
 Official websites: Primal Scream The Stone Roses
 Official website celebrating the 20th anniversary of The Stone Roses' debut album

1962 births
Living people
Alternative rock bass guitarists
British alternative rock musicians
Madchester musicians
English rock bass guitarists
Male bass guitarists
English people of Irish descent
Musicians from Greater Manchester
People from Failsworth
Primal Scream members
The Stone Roses members
Freebass members